Nebria lariollei lariollei is a subspecies of beetle in the family Carabidae that is endemic to France.

References

External links
Nebria lariollei lariollei at Fauna Europaea

Beetles described in 1865
Endemic beetles of Metropolitan France